Aphyle flavicolor is a moth of the family Erebidae first described by George Talbot in 1928. It found in Brazil.

References

Moths described in 1928
Phaegopterina
Moths of South America